The 2010–11 I-League was the fourth season of the I-League, which waa the highest football league competition in India during the time. It ran from 3 December 2010 to May 2011. Dempo are the defending champions. On 30 May 2011 Salgaocar SC won the title by beating JCT FC 2–0 in the final match of the season.

Teams 
Sporting Clube de Goa and Shillong Lajong FC were relegated at the end of the 2009–10 season after finishing in the bottom two places of the table. They were replaced by 2010 Second Division champions ONGC FC and runners-up HAL SC.

In other team changes, Mahindra United were disbanded at the end of the 2009–10 season to concentrate on youth football. They were replaced by Indian Arrows, a newly founded team under the auspices of the AIFF.

Managerial changes

League table

Results

Top goalscorers
Updated on 10 April 2015.

Hat-tricks

  Mandjou Keita was the first Hat-trick scored by a Pune player in I-League for their franchise.
  Jeje Lalpekhlua was the first Hat-trick for Pailan Arrows team in I-League.
  Tolgay Özbey was the first Australian to score a Hat-trick in I-League.

Scoring
Most games failed to score in:
Most goals scored in a match by a single team:Dempo 14–0
Highest scoring game:Dempo 14–0 Air India
Widest winning margin:Dempo 14–0 Air India

Clean sheets
Most clean sheets: 11 – East Bengal

See also
 2010 Indian Federation Cup
 List of Indian football transfers 2010-2011

References

 
I-League seasons
1
India